Kevin Hughes was one of the pioneers of the World Wide Web in the United States, while a student at Honolulu Community College (HCC), in Hawaii.

He created one of the first campus web sites, including novel (at the time) ideas such as a virtual tour of a campus museum. He also wrote software that was used in early web sites to index web pages: Simple Web Indexing System for Humans, or SWISH.

Developments
Hughes later developed seminal technologies for numerous commerce web sites.

Icon Design
He also designed the original public domain icons that come with the Apache HTTP Server.

Awards
He is one of only six inductees in the World Wide Web Hall of Fame announced at the first international conference on the World Wide Web in 1994.

References

External links 
Kevcom

Living people
Internet pioneers
Year of birth missing (living people)
Honolulu Community College alumni